The Demon is a 1926 American silent Western film directed by Clifford Smith and starring Jack Hoxie, Lola Todd and William Welsh.

Cast
 Jack Hoxie as Dane Gordon 
 Lola Todd as Goldie Fleming 
 William Welsh as Percival Wade 
 Jere Austin as Bat Jackson 
 Al J. Jennings as Dan Carroll 
 George Grandee as The Secretary 
 Harry Semels as Joseph Lomax

References

External links
 

1926 films
1926 Western (genre) films
Universal Pictures films
Films directed by Clifford Smith
American black-and-white films
Silent American Western (genre) films
1920s English-language films
1920s American films